Lahe  is a village in Põlva Parish, Põlva County in southeastern Estonia.

Place called Ridali is located in Lahe. In nearby Suurküla, there is Ridali Airfield (ICAO: EERI).

References

Villages in Põlva County